The 2020 Georgian Cup was a single elimination association football tournament which began in August 2020 and ended on 4 December 2020. The winner of the cup earned a place in the first qualifying round of the 2021–22 UEFA Europa Conference League.

Saburtalo Tbilisi were the defending Georgian Cup champions after winning the final in the previous season over Locomotive Tbilisi by a score of 3–1.

First round 
Eighteen first round matches were played on 20–24 August 2020.

|}

Second round 
Twelve second round matches were played on 24–30 August 2020.

|}

Third round 
Eight third round matches were played on 17–21 September 2020.

|}

Quarter finals 
Four quarter final matches were played on 26–27 September 2020.

|}

Semi finals 
Two semi final matches were played on 8 November 2020.

|}

Final
The final was played on 4 December 2020.

See also 
 2020 Erovnuli Liga

References

External links
 Official site  

Georgian Cup seasons
Georgian Cup
Cup